South High School is a public high school in Willoughby, Ohio.  It is one of two high schools in the Willoughby-Eastlake City School District. The school was created when the Willoughby Union High School was split into South High and North High School.

Located approximately 10 miles east of Cleveland, Willoughby South High School is located close to scenic and historical Downtown Willoughby. The total enrollment is approximately 1,200 students in grades 9-12. The principal is Brian Patrick and the two assistant principals are David Miller (11-12 grades) and Jennifer Neumeyer (9-10 grades). Tom Mckinnon is the athletic director.

Willoughby South, along with its sister school (and rival), Eastlake North High School, have been awarded the Blue Ribbon School award by the US Department of Education (the highest award attainable by American Schools), and both schools have competed in the Ohio Academic Decathlon competition multiple times.

Athletics
Willoughby South is a member of the Ohio High School Athletic Association and part of the 8-team Premier Athletic Conference.

Sports include:

{| class="wikitable" style="text-align:center; width:18em;"
|-
!                            Sport         !! Boys     !! Girls
|-
| style="text-align:left;" | Baseball      || ✓ || 
|-
| style="text-align:left;" | Softball      ||          || ✓
|-
| style="text-align:left;" | Basketball    || ✓ || ✓
|-
| style="text-align:left;" | Soccer        || ✓ || ✓
|-
| style="text-align:left;" | Cross-Country || ✓ || ✓
|-
| style="text-align:left;" | Golf          || ✓ || ✓
|-
| style="text-align:left;" | Wrestling     || ✓ || 
|-
| style="text-align:left;" | Volleyball    ||          || ✓
|-
| style="text-align:left;" | Swimming      || ✓ || ✓
|-
| style="text-align:left;" | Track & Field || ✓ || ✓
|-
| style="text-align:left;" | Tennis        || ✓ || ✓
|-
| style="text-align:left;" | Football      || ✓ || 
|-
| style="text-align:left;" | Cheerleading  || ✓ || ✓
|-
| style="text-align:left;" | Lacrosse      ||   ✓
| 
|-
| style="text-align:left;" | Hockey      ||  
 ||  
|}

Academic Decathlon

Willoughby South has won the Academic Decathlon state competition 8 times and has attended several national competitions.

Notable alumni

Gregory J. Harbaugh (1974) - former NASA astronaut.
Kareem Hunt (2013) - NFL running back.
Michael Hutter (2001) - professional wrestler under the name Ethan Carter III.
Katie McGregor (1995) - track, cross country and marathon runner.
Betty Thomas (1965) - actress, film and television director.
 Dan Whalen (2006) - professional football player

Flag controversy
For many years, the flag of South High was the Confederate Battle Flag used in the American Civil War. The school has since then adopted a new flag, which is simply a re-coloration of the Confederate Flag.
The original decision to name the school the "South Rebels" stemmed from the original Union High, with "South Rebels" seeming to some to be the logical name for the school after the "Union" was split. However, opponents argued that the school's name and logo seemed to celebrate the Confederacy, whose reasons for seceding from the Union had strong ties to the institution of slavery, and that the school was named during the Civil Rights Era.

In October 2010, a shirt depicting a re-coloration of the Confederate Flag was sold in the spirit shop. The principal decided to pull the shirts. The spirit shop offered to refund any money students paid for the shirt or to replace them with a less inflammatory version. However, many students chose to keep the Confederate flag shirt as an expression of historical remembrance.

Shooting incident
On September 2, 2008, a student brought a gun to school and fired two rounds within the school, one piercing the ceiling, another shattering a trophy case. The student then put the gun to his head, but was talked out of doing himself any harm by the Vice Principal of Willoughby South, Jeff Lyons.

Removal of Confederate Rebel Mascot

On August 17, 2017, days after the Unite the Right rally in Charlottesville, Virginia, Willoughby-Eastlake City Schools announced the decision to remove the Confederate soldier mascot while keeping the name "Rebels" and also the school colors of grey and blue.

References

External links
 School Website
 Willoughby South helmet images at ohiohelmetproject.com

High schools in Lake County, Ohio
Public high schools in Ohio
Educational institutions in the United States with year of establishment missing